Safa Abdel Moneim (born 27 December 1960) is an Egyptian writer, novelist, educator and a researcher in folk literature. She is born in 1960. She has published nine short story collections and twelve novels. Among her most prominent works are Within the Spirit's Beauty, a novel written in colloquial Egyptian Arabic which has been translated to English and Italian, and the short-story collection At Night When He Left.  She also has several studies published in various newspapers and magazines. Her most recent published novel is My Granny Apple.

Biography 
Safa Abdel Moneim Mahmoud Zayed was born on 27 December 1960 in Cairo. She graduated in 1986 from Al Helmeya High School after which she earned a B.A. in education from Ain-Shams University.

Safa Abdel Moneim's literary career began by reading her short stories in a youth centre in Shubra Al Kheima until publishing her very first short story in the Qalyoubia newspapers. she was awarded in a national short story competition for youth centres in 1983. Her first short story collection 'Hikayat Al'lail' was published in 1984, in which five stories were published in a joint-collection and discussed in several seminars in cultural and youth centers. She lists Anton Chekhov's story 'The Death of a Government Clerk' and Yusuf Idris' 'A Glance' as her most significant literary influencers. Safa Adel Moneim started her cultural when she and her late husband, poet and writer, Magdi Al-Gabri held weekly symposiums to discuss and criticize works of literature and poetry. These symposiums lasted from 1990 until her in 1998. Safa Abdel Moniem has been working as a school principal since 2009. She documented her career as a school principal in her novel 'Journals of a School Principal'  Abdel Moneim holds several memberships in various cultural, literary and educational institutions and unions, as she is a member of the Writers Union of Egypt and Cairo Atelier. She is also a lecturer at the General Authority for Cultural Palaces, a member of the Egyptian Society for folk Literature and the International Pen Club.

Works

Novels 

 "Granny Apple", 2020
 "Journals of A School Principal", 2020
 "A Peacock Above The Tree", 2020
 "The Edge of Soul", 2019
 "Merit Filter", 2009
 "A Female Artist's Home",  2009
 "He Called Her "Innana", 2008
 "Whom She Saw", 2008
 "Like a Witch", 2008
 "The Wind of Simoom", 2003
 "Within the Spirit's Beauty", 2001

Short-story collections 

 "Sure, It's Really Fine", 2020
 "The Lady of the Place", 2013
 "At Night When He Left", 2009
 "Fantasy of a Female", 2010
 "In a Way or Another", 2009
 "Girls and Girls", 2000
 "Friendly Little Things", 1996
 "That Cairo Tempts Me with Its Bare legs", 1991
 "Tales of The Night", 1984

Encyclopaedias 

 "Children Songs Encyclopaedia" , 2008
 "Describing Egypt Now Encyclopaedia",  2008 (contributing)

References 

1960 births
Egyptian poets
Egyptian novelists
21st-century Egyptian poets
21st-century novelists
21st-century Egyptian women writers
Living people